Fitsum Arega Gebrekidan is an Ethiopian diplomat who is the current Ethiopian Ambassador to the United States. He was the Director General of the Ethiopian Investment Commission and the Chief of Staff of the Prime Minister of Ethiopia. He presented his credentials to President Donald Trump on 10 April 2019.

Early life and education 
Fitsum was born and raised in Addis Ababa, and received his higher education in the United Kingdom. He attended the University of Manchester, where he received a master's degree in Development Economics and Policy Management. He later received an MBA degree from Open University (OU) Business School, as well as a PgD from the University of Birmingham.

Diplomatic career

Grand Ethiopian Renaissance Dam (GERD) 
In 2020, Fitsum opposed reported plans by the United States government to cut funding to Ethiopia over the Grand Ethiopian Renaissance Dam (GERD). He described the dam as a project that "will pull Ethiopia out of darkness".

Fitsum celebrated reports that the U.S. would restore aid to Ethiopia in February 2021, reiterated his support for the GERD. Fitsum claimed it would help provide electricity to 60 million people and boost environmental efforts.

American Ethiopian Public Affairs Committee (AEPAC) 
In 2021, Fitsum announced the establishment of the American Ethiopian Public Affairs Committee (AEPAC). The stated purpose of the newly-formed organization is to entrench the bilateral relationship between the United States and Ethiopia.

References

Living people
Ethiopian diplomats
Addis Ababa University alumni
Alumni of the University of Manchester
Year of birth missing (living people)
Ambassadors of Ethiopia to the United States